Condé-sur-Seulles is a commune in the Calvados department in the Normandy region in northwestern France.

It is situated on the river Seulles.

Population

See also
Condé-sur-Ifs
Condé-sur-Noireau
Communes of the Calvados department

References

Communes of Calvados (department)
Calvados communes articles needing translation from French Wikipedia